Ion Prodan, also known as Ivan Prodan, is a Moldovan footballer who plays as a center back for Daco-Getica București in the Romanian Liga II. He was also a member of Moldova U21 until 2013.

References

External links
Profile at Moldova Sports

1992 births
Living people
Moldovan footballers
Association football defenders
Moldovan Super Liga players
FC Milsami Orhei players
FC Speranța Crihana Veche players
FC Saxan players
CS Petrocub Hîncești players
Liga II players
LPS HD Clinceni players
CSM Reșița players
ASC Daco-Getica București players
Moldovan expatriate footballers
Expatriate footballers in Romania
Moldovan expatriate sportspeople in Romania